Fagradalsfjall is a tuya volcano formed in the Last Glacial Period on the Reykjanes Peninsula, around  from Reykjavík, Iceland. The highest summit in this area is Langhóll . No volcanic eruption had occurred for 815 years on the Reykjanes Peninsula until 19 March 2021 when a fissure vent appeared in Geldingadalir to the south of Fagradalsfjall mountain. The 2021 eruption was effusive and continued emitting fresh lava sporadically until 18 September 2021.

The eruption was unique among the volcanoes monitored in Iceland so far and it has been suggested that it may develop into a shield volcano. Due to its relative ease of access from Reykjavík, the volcano has become an attraction for local people and foreign tourists. Another eruption, very similar to the 2021 eruption, began on 3 August 2022. It is still considered ongoing, although there has been no visible activity since 21 August 2022.

Etymology
The mountain massif is named after  ("fair dale" or "beautiful valley") which is at its northwest. The 2021 lava field is named Fagradalshraun .

Tectonic setting
The mountain Fagradalsfjall is a volcano in areas of eruptive fissures, cones and lava fields also named Fagradalsfjall. The Fagradalsfjall fissure swarm is considered in some publications to be a branch or a secondary part of the Krýsuvík-Trölladyngja volcanic system on the Reykjanes Peninsula in southwest Iceland. Other scientists  propose that Fagradalsfjall could represent a separate volcanic system from Krýsuvík and it is regarded as such in some publications. It is in a zone of active rifting at the divergent boundary between the Eurasian and North American plates. Plate spreading at the Reykjanes peninsula is highly oblique and is characterized by a superposition of left-lateral shear and extension. The Krýsuvík volcanic system has been moderately active in the Holocene, with the most recent eruptive episode before the 21st century having occurred in the 12th-century CE. The Fagradalsfjall mountain was formed from an eruption under the ice sheet in the Pleistocene period, and it had lain dormant for 6,342 years until an eruption fissure appeared in the area in March 2021.

The unrest and eruption in Fagradalsfjall are part of a larger unrest period on Reykjanes Peninsula including unrest within several volcanic systems and among others also the unrest at Þorbjörn volcano next to Svartsengi and the Blue Lagoon during the spring of 2020. However, eruptions at this location were unexpected as other nearby systems on the Reykjanes Peninsula had been more active.

The 2021 eruption is the first to be observed on this branch of the plate boundary in Reykjanes. It appears to be different from most eruptions observed where the main volcanoes are fed by a magma chamber underneath, whose size and pressure on it determine the size and length of eruption. This eruption may be fed by a relatively narrow and long channel (~ 17 km) that is linked to the Earth's mantle, and the lava flow may be determined by the properties of the eruption channel.

2021 eruption series

Precursors
Beginning December 2019 and into March 2021, a swarm of earthquakes, two of which reached magnitude , rocked the Reykjanes peninsula, sparking concerns that an eruption was imminent, because the earthquakes were thought to have been triggered by dyke intrusions and magma movements under the peninsula. Minor damage to homes from a 4 February 2021 magnitude 5.7 earthquake was reported. In the three weeks before the eruption, more than 40,000 tremors were recorded by seismographs.

Eruption fissures in Geldingadalir
On 19 March 2021, an effusive eruption started at approximately 8:45 PM local time in Geldingadalir (the singular "Geldingadalur"  is also often used) to the south of Fagradalsfjall, the first known eruption on the peninsula in about 800 years. Fagradalsfjall had been dormant for 6,000 years. The eruptive activity was first announced by the Icelandic Meteorological Office at 9:40 PM. As of the March eruptions, the lava flows posed no threat to residents, as the area is mostly uninhabited.

The eruption has been called Geldingadalsgos ( "Geldingadalur eruption"). On the 26 March, the main eruptive vent was at 63.8889 N, 22.2704 W, on the site of a previous eruptive mound. The eruption may be a shield volcano eruption, which may last for several years. It could be seen from the suburbs of the capital city of Reykjavík and had attracted a large number of visitors. However, high levels of volcanic gases such as carbon dioxide and carbon monoxide made parts of the area inaccessible.

On 13 April 2021, 4 new craters formed in Geldingadalir within the lava flows. The lava output which had been somewhat reduced over the last days, increased again.

Eruption fissures on Fagradalsfjall
As a precaution the area was evacuated by the coast guard.

Some time later, another eruption fissure opened parallel to the first on the slopes of Fagradalsfjall.

About 36 hours later, around midnight on 6–7 April, another eruption fissure opened up. The lava from this fissure flowed into Geldingadalur valley.

Another fissure opened during the night of 10–11 April 2021 between the two open fissures on the slopes of Fagradalsfjall. In total, 6 fissures had opened until the 13 April and at each fissure, activity concentrated and formed individual vents. Towards the end of April, activity at most vents, apart from Vent 5, started to decrease.

By 2 May 2021, only one fissure, Vent 5 that appeared near the initial eruption site on Geldingadalir, remained active. It developed into a volcano with the occasional explosive eruptions within its crater that sometimes reached heights of hundreds of meters. The lava flowed into the Meradalir valleys, and later the Nátthagi  valley.

A number of smaller openings appeared temporarily, one small vent was reported to have erupted near the main crater on 1 July. On 14 August, lava spurted from what appeared to be a hole on the crater wall, and this turned out to be an independent eruption. Cracks appeared on Gónhóll  that was once popular with spectators in August but no lava flowed at the site.  After eight and a half days of inactivity at the main volcano, lava broke through the surface in the lava field to the north of the crater in a number of places.

Lava and gas output: Development of the eruption
The eruption showed distinct phases in its eruption pattern. This is followed by a period of two and a half months of eruption at a single crater with largely continuous and sometimes pulsating eruption and lava flow of around  lasting until the end of June. From then on until early September was a phase of fluctuating eruption with periodic strong lava flow interrupted by periods of inactivity.

On 12 April, scientists from the University of Iceland measured the lava field's area to be  and its volume to be .

The lava produced by the eruption shows a composition differing from historical Reykjanes lavas.

Results from measurements published by University of Iceland on 26 April 2021 showed that the composition of eruption products had changed, to more closely resemble the typical Holocene basalts of Reykjanes peninsula.

The eruption pattern changed on 2 May from a continuous eruption and lava flow to a pulsating one, where periods of eruptions alternated with periods of inactivity, with each cycle lasting 10 minutes to half an hour. The lava jets have been explained as explosive release of ancient trapped water or magma coming in contact with groundwater.

The increase in lava flow is unusual, as eruption outputs typically decrease with time. Scientists from the University of Iceland hypothesize that there is a large magma reservoir deep under the volcano, not the typical smaller magma chamber associated with these kinds of eruptions that empty over a short time. The channel widened in the first six weeks leading to increased lava flow. The eruption may create a new shield volcano if it continues for long enough. The formation of such volcano has not been studied before in real time, and this eruption can offer insights into the working of the magmatic systems.

Two defensive barriers were created starting 14 May as an experiment to stop lava flowing into the Nátthagi valley where telecommunication cables are buried, and further on to the southern coastal road Suðurlandsvegur. However, the lava soon flowed over the top of eastern barrier 22 May, and cascaded down to the Nátthagi. Lava flowed over the western barrier on 5 June. Lava flow blocked the main trail that provide access to the main viewing area on Gónhóll, first on 4 June, then again early in the morning of 13 June at another location. A further wall five meters high and 200 meters long was then created on 15 June in an attempt to divert lava flow away from Nátthagakriki  with important infrastructure to its west and north. A barrier of 3 to 5 m high started to be constructed on 25 June at the mouth of Nátthagi to delay the flow of the lava over the southern coastal road and properties on Ísólfsskáli , although it was expected that the lava would eventually flow over the area into the sea. A proposal to build a bridge over the road to allow the lava flow underneath was rejected.

The lava flow became continuous, which can be either above or below ground, although the eruptions also became calmer with the occasional increase in activity. There appeared to be no direct connection between the activity at the crater and lava flow. The lava flow can be tracked by helicopter or satellite, for example via radar imaging that can penetrate through the clouds and volcanic smog that had become more frequent in the area by July.

The eruptions stayed unusually constant until 23 June, and the activity then reduced significantly on 28 June, becoming inactive for many hours, and resuming on 29 June. It shifted to a pattern of many hours of inactivity, for example on 1 July and 4 July, with the eruptions resuming later. Lava flow from the crater ceased for 4 days from 5 July until 9 July, when eruptions resumed, initially with a periodicity of around 10 to 15 minutes, then lengthening to 3 to 4 an hour by 13 July. Lava has also been observed emerging from the bottom of the volcano on 10 July with considerable amount of lava flowing into the Meradalir valleys, and a section of the volcano on the northeastern side also broke off on the 14 July. Lava flow was estimated to be around  but averaged to  due to the periods of inactivity from late June to mid-July, half of the flow rate in May and June. The periodic lull in activity continued, with 7 to 13 hours of inactivity and similar period of eruption by late July, which lengthened to a pattern of mostly around 15 hours of inactivity alternating with around 20 hours of continuous eruption in August. It has been speculated that there are blockages at the top hundred metres of the eruption channel. By July, this eruption had become larger than most eruptions that have ever occurred on the Reykjanes peninsula. Measurement taken on 27 July indicated that the lava flow had increased again, returned to and possibly exceeding the peak level last seen in June. After a couple of months where the lava flowed mainly into the Meradalir valleys, the lava started to flow down the Nátthagi valley again on 21 August. The eruption by now had become the second longest in Iceland of the 21st century.

The volcano stopped erupting on 2 September, but lava flow resumed on 11 September, with the magma breaking through the lava field surface in several places. However, the main crater channel appeared to have been blocked, and the crater was filled with lava from a source underneath the northwestern wall through a crack on the wall, and lava also flowed outside the volcano through the wall. After a period of continuous eruption, a pulsing pattern of activity last seen in April/May started on 13 September, a pattern believed to be similar to what is observed in geysers where the frequency of eruption may be determined by the size of the reservoir below and how quickly it is filled up. The volcano was pulsing at a rate of around eight eruptions per hour on 14 September. No lava flowed out directly from the crater, instead lava began to emerge in significant amount from outside the volcano on 15 September. On 16 September 2021, after 181 days of eruption, it became the longest eruption of the 21st century in Iceland. The eruption stopped again on 18 September, but the activity decreased unusually slowly. On October 18, the alert level was lowered from "Orange" to "Yellow" due to no lava having erupted since September 18. The Icelandic meteorological office also stated that "it is assessed that Krýsuvík volcano is currently in a non-eruptive state. The activity might escalate again, so the situation is monitored closely".

2022 eruption

On 3 August 2022, after weeks of unrest on the Reykjanes Peninsula including over 10,000 recorded earthquakes from 30 July to 3 August with two quakes measuring over 5.0 Mw, another eruption began at Fagradalsfjall. 
A live stream from a camera at the site showed magma spewing from a narrow fissure vent. On 4 August the Icelandic Meteorological Office estimated it 360 meters in length. Over 1,830 people visited the volcano on the first day. It erupted over a lava flow from the 2021 eruption. The Icelandic Meteorological Office initially advised people not to go near Fagradalsfjall due to the new eruption.

Iceland's Department of Civil Protection and Emergency Management stated that no lives or infrastructure were currently at risk from the eruption. Iceland's main airport, Keflavík Airport, was briefly on alert, which is a standard procedure during eruptions, though the facility did not cancel any flights. Airplanes were prohibited from flying over the site, although some helicopters were sent in to survey the eruption. The eruption was not producing large plumes, though it was likely to affect air quality and pollution in immediately surrounding areas.
Professor of geophysics Magnús Tumi Guðmundsson said, judging from the initial lava flow, that the eruption was likely five to ten times bigger than the 2021 eruption, but that it was not "the big one". From the nearby geomorphology, the lava was likely to flow into the Meradalir valleys.

The lava flow decreased around 17 August and stopped on 21 August 2022. Since then, there has been no visible activity at the new site.

Risk mitigation and tourism 
Due to the volcanic site's proximity to the town of Grindavik, Vogar and to a lesser extent Keflavik, Keflavik International Airport and the Greater Reykjavík Area, Iceland's Department of Civil Protection and Emergency Management has created protocols for evacuation plans of nearby settlements and in case of gas pollution and/or lava flows. The large number of tourists visiting the eruption sites is also a concern to authorities, especially under-equipped tourists and those who do not heed official closures during inclement weather or new lava flows.

As of the second eruption in 2022, there is little risk of lava flows blocking roads or reaching settlements, but this could change if the Meradalir valleys fill with lava or another fissure opens up in a different area.

Air traffic 
The eruption site is only around 20 km from Iceland's main international airport, Keflavik International Airport. Due to the eruption's effusive nature with little to no ash production, it is not considered a risk to air traffic. The ICAO Aviation Colour code has mostly stayed orange (ongoing eruption with low to no ash production). This has meant that no interruptions to flight traffic to and from Keflavik International Airport. Icelandic Coast Guard helicopters have conducted many research and monitoring flights around the volcano as well as large numbers of helicopter tour companies operating and landing in the vicinity, as well as small private aviation and sightseeing fixed wing aircraft circling the eruption site. Many unmanned drones are also active around the volcano site.

Roads and utilities 
The main concerns are if lava flows were to reach the main highway to Keflavik and the airport, Road 41, as well as the south coast road, Road 427, an important evacuation route for the town of Grindavik.

In addition, if the lava flows travel northwards, an important high-voltage transmission line to Keflavik is in danger of being cut off. Communications fiber routes both to the north and south side of the volcano are also in danger of being cut off, which could impact communications and the data center industry in Keflavik. However, the fissure's location as of August 2022 is unlikey to affect the roads and utilities.

Within a week of the starts of the 2021 eruption, power and fiber-optic lines were laid from Grindavik to support operations of the authorities near the eruption site as well as 4G cell and TETRA masts were set up to ensure access to communications and emergency services (112) for tourists and authorities.

Lava flow experiments 

In July 2021, in collaboration with Iceland's Department of Civil Protection and Emergency Management, utility companies conducted an experiment by burying various types of utilities (underground electrical cables, fibers, water lines and sewage line) with varying levels of insulation in order to see how overland lava flows affect buried utilities. Another separate experiment was conducted by constructing large levees to control direction of lava flows; they were moderately effective in controlling slow moving lava flows.

Tourism management 
The Fagradalsfjall volcano site is unusual in terms of its close proximity to Iceland's main international airport and popular tourist sites such as the Blue Lagoon. The site is only around 60 km from Reykjavík.  Access is a short distance from Grindavik along paved Road 427, with limited parking available by the trailhead. Depending on the route taken, the hike to the new site is around 6–8 km each way, taking around 3–6 hours in hiking time (not including sightseeing or stops). Many parts of the route are extremely steep with uneven rocky ground, as well as being poorly signed due to the recency of the eruption. Depending on the wind direction, toxic gas pollution can be a risk as well as unpredictable lava flows and new fissures opening up.

Due to its easy access, a very large number of locals and tourists have visited the site. Around 10,000 people visited the 2022 eruption on its first day. Authorities have kept the site open for the most part, and try to inform rather than ban people from visiting the site. There have been no deaths reported as a result of the eruption, However, many injuries have been indirectly caused by the volcano, due to inadequately equipped tourists visiting the site with reports of broken ankles, lost travellers and hypothermia as weather is very unpredictable in the area.

Authorities have used Location Based SMS messages to inform and warn tourists travelling to the site to be prepared. The site is manned during busy periods by the volunteers from the Icelandic Association for Search and Rescue, as well as local police. The site has had to be evacuated at least once due to fast moving lava flows. The site was closed for 2 days from the 7th of August 2022 due to inclement weather, however groups of tourists who did not heed the closures had to be rescued by the local volunteer search and rescue team, Þorbjörn.

Supposed burial site
The area where the volcano first erupted is thought to be the ancient burial site of an early Norse settler Ísólfur frá Ísólfsstöðum . However, a quick archaeological survey of Geldingadalur after the eruption started found no evidence of human remains in the area.

1943 accident

On 3 May 1943, LTG Frank Maxwell Andrews, a U.S. Army senior officer, founder of the United States Army Air Forces, and a leading candidate for command of the Allied invasion of Europe was killed along with 14 others when their B-24 aircraft Hot Stuff crashed into the side of the mountain.

See also
 Volcanism of Iceland
 Geology of Reykjanes Peninsula
 Geography of Iceland
 Geology of Iceland
 List of volcanic eruptions on Iceland

Notes

References

External links

 
Data from University of Iceland re. the eruption at Fagradalsfjall (continuously updated)
Icelandic Met Office: Gas dispersion forecast
A volcanic eruption has begun — Icelandic Met Office
Video by Icelandic Meteorological Office taken a few hours after the eruption started
Live video of the March 2021 eruption
RÚV. Video of the eruption on 12 April 2021
Interactive 3D model of the lava flows as of 18 April 2021.

Active volcanoes
Fissure vents
Lava lakes
Reykjanes Volcanic Belt
Subglacial volcanoes of Iceland
Tuyas of Iceland
Tuyas
Volcanic eruptions in 2021
Volcanic eruptions in 2022